Federal Reserve Economic Data (FRED) is a database maintained by the Research division of the Federal Reserve Bank of St. Louis that has more than 816,000 economic time series from various sources. They cover banking, business/fiscal, consumer price indexes, employment and population, exchange rates, gross domestic product, interest rates, monetary aggregates, producer price indexes, reserves and monetary base, U.S. trade and international transactions, and U.S. financial data. The time series are compiled by the Federal Reserve and many are collected from government agencies such as the U.S. Census and the Bureau of Labor Statistics.

Services

ALFRED (Archival Federal Reserve Economic Data) lets users retrieve vintage versions of economic data that were available on specific dates in history.  The ALFRED website states that “In general, economic data for past observation periods are revised as more accurate estimates become available. As a result, previous vintages of data can be superseded and may no longer be available from various data sources."  It also says that "Vintage or real-time economic data allows academics to reproduce others’ research, build more accurate forecasting models and analyze economic policy decisions using the data available at the time.” 

GeoFRED is a data-mapping tool that displays FRED data series in color-coded form on the state, metropolitan statistical areas and county levels.

CASSIDI is a data service that provides nationwide data on banking market structures and definitions, as well as banking markets for individual depository institutions. 

FRASER (The Federal Reserve Archival System for Economic Research) is a digital archive begun in 2004 to safeguard, preserve and provide easy access to the United States’ economic history—particularly the history of the Federal Reserve System—through digitization of documents related to the U.S. financial system.  Digitized documents include:
 Publications of the Federal Reserve Board of Governors 
 Publications of each of the Federal Reserve banks 
 Statements, speeches and archival materials of Federal Reserve policymakers 
 Government data publications 
 Statistical releases 
 Congressional hearings 
 Books 
 Reports by various organizations

To create and maintain FRASER, the St. Louis Fed collaborated with the United States Government Printing Office, Federal Depository Library Program libraries and several university and public libraries. 

St. Louis Fed Research also hosts IDEAS, a bibliographic database drawn from Research Papers in Economics (RePEc), which consists of economic research from more than one million academic articles and papers.  As of January 2022, the IDEAS site states it has more 3,800,000 items of research that can be browsed or searched, and more than 3,400,000 that can be downloaded in full text.

Usage
The economic data published on FRED are widely reported in the media and play a key role in financial markets. In a 2012 Business Insider article titled "The Most Amazing Economics Website in the World", Joe Weisenthal quoted Paul Krugman as saying: "I think just about everyone doing short-order research — trying to make sense of economic issues in more or less real time — has become a FRED fanatic."

FRED economic indicators (partial list)

See also
Federal Reserve Bank of St. Louis

References

External links
 
 Federal Depository Library
 U.S. Government Printing Office - Federal Digital System

Economic indicators
Economic databases
Federal Reserve System
Federal Reserve Bank of St. Louis data services